Solemn Promise is a 2009 Serbian drama film directed by Srđan Karanović. The film was selected as the Serbian entry for the Best Foreign Language Film at the 83rd Academy Awards but it did not make the final shortlist.

Plot
The film portrays the drama between Azem, an Albanian man, and Lea, a Slovenian woman married to Filip, a Serb. The events happen when the young couple moves to a place in southern Serbia at the outbreak of World War I, when Filip receives the invitation to join the military ranks. He leaves his young attractive wife in the custody of the middle-aged Albanian. The film speaks about love, the sacred Albanian promise ‘Besa’, as well as the cultural, ethnic, and language barriers in the Balkans. The film shows how the sacred given word can be stronger than love and temptation.

Cast
 Miki Manojlović as Azem
 Iva Krajnc as Lea
 Nebojša Dugalić as Filip
 Radivoje Bukvić as Lieutenant Jevrem
 Ana Kostovska as School teacher
 Radivoj Knežević
 Jovo Makšić as Mane
 Nikola Krneta as Soldier
 Slobodan Filipović as Gendarme

See also
 List of submissions to the 83rd Academy Awards for Best Foreign Language Film
 List of Serbian submissions for the Academy Award for Best Foreign Language Film

References

External links

2009 films
2009 drama films
Serbian drama films
2000s Serbian-language films
Films directed by Srđan Karanović
World War I films
Films set in Belgrade
Films shot in Belgrade